Dreams from My Father: A Story of Race and Inheritance (1995) is a memoir by Barack Obama that explores the events of his early years in Honolulu and Chicago until his entry into Harvard Law School in 1988. Obama originally published his memoir in 1995, when he was starting his political campaign for the Illinois Senate.

After Obama won the U.S. Senate Democratic primary victory in Illinois in 2004, the book was re-published that year. He gave the keynote address at the 2004 Democratic National Convention (DNC) and won the US Senate seat in the fall. Obama launched his presidential campaign three years later. The 2004 edition includes a new preface by Obama and his DNC keynote address.

According to The New York Times, Obama modeled Dreams from My Father on Ralph Ellison's novel Invisible Man. The book, frequently praised for its literary qualities, has also been criticized for inaccuracies and over-use of artistic license. Obama acknowledges using composite characterizations and adjusted timelines in the book's introduction, writing that the "hazards" of autobiography could not be fully avoided.

Narrative

Childhood
Barack Obama recounts in his book of how his parents met, and his own life until his enrollment at Harvard Law School in 1988. His parents were Barack Obama Sr. of Kenya, and Ann Dunham of Wichita, Kansas, who had met while they were students at the University of Hawaii. In the first chapter, speaking of his father and namesake, Obama states "[h]e had left Hawaii back in 1963, when I was only two years old." Obama's parents separated in 1963 and divorced in 1964, when he was two years old. The elder Obama later went to Harvard to pursue his PhD in economics. After that, he returned to Kenya to fulfill the promise to his nation. Obama himself formed an image of his absent father from stories told by his mother and maternal grandparents. He saw his father one more time, in 1971, when Obama Sr. came to Hawaii for a month's visit. The elder Obama, who had remarried, died in a car accident in Kenya in 1982.

After her divorce, Ann Dunham married Lolo Soetoro, a Javanese surveyor from Indonesia who was also a graduate student in Hawaii. The family moved to Jakarta when Obama was six years old. At age ten, Obama returned to Hawaii under the care of his maternal grandparents for the better educational opportunities available there. He was enrolled in the fifth grade at Punahou School, a private college-preparatory school, where he was one of six black students. Obama attended Punahou from the fifth grade until his graduation in 1979. Obama writes in his book: "For my grandparents, my admission into Punahou Academy heralded the start of something grand, an elevation in the family status that they took great pains to let everyone know." There, he met Ray (Keith Kakugawa), who was two years older and also multi-racial. He introduced Obama to the African-American community.

Adulthood
Upon graduating from high school, Obama moved to the contiguous United States for studies at Occidental College. He describes having lived a "party" lifestyle of drug and alcohol use. After two years at Occidental, Obama transferred to Columbia College at Columbia University, where he majored in Political Science. After graduation, Obama worked for a year in business. He moved to Chicago, where he worked for a non-profit as a community organizer in the Altgeld Gardens housing project on the city's mostly black South Side. Obama recounts the difficulty of the experience, as his program faced resistance from entrenched community leaders and apathy on the part of the established bureaucracy. During this period, Obama first visited Chicago's Trinity United Church of Christ, which became the center of his religious life. Before attending Harvard, Obama decided to visit relatives in Kenya for the first time in his life. He recounts part of this experience in the final and emotional part of the book. Obama acknowledged his entire memoir to reflect on his personal experiences with race relations in the United States.

Reception 
In discussing Dreams from My Father, Toni Morrison, a Nobel Laureate novelist, has called Obama "a writer in my high esteem" and the book "quite extraordinary". She praised 
his ability to reflect on this extraordinary mesh of experiences that he has had, some familiar and some not, and to really meditate on that the way he does, and to set up scenes in narrative structure, dialogue, conversation—all of these things that you don't often see, obviously, in the routine political memoir biography. ... It's unique. It's his. There are no other ones like that. 
In an interview for The Daily Beast, author Philip Roth said he had read Dreams from My Father "with great interests", and commented that he had found it "well done and very persuasive and memorable." The book "may be the best-written memoir ever produced by an American politician", wrote Time columnist Joe Klein. In 2008, The Guardian Rob Woodard wrote that Dreams from My Father "is easily the most honest, daring, and ambitious volume put out by a major US politician in the last 50 years." Michiko Kakutani, the Pulitzer Prize-winning critic for The New York Times, described it as "the most evocative, lyrical and candid autobiography written by a future president." Writing for the Guardian, literary critic Robert McCrum wrote that Obama had "executed an affecting personal memoir with grace and style, narrating an enthralling story with honesty, elegance and wit, as well as an instinctive gift for storytelling." McCrum had included the book in his list of the 100 best non-fiction books of all time.

In 2011, Time magazine listed the book on its top 100 non-fiction books written in English since 1923. The audiobook edition earned Obama the Grammy Award for Best Spoken Word Album in 2006. Five days before being sworn in as President in 2009, Obama secured a $500,000 advance for an abridged version of Dreams from My Father for middle-school-aged children.

Accuracy 
Obama acknowledges using composite characterizations and adjusted chronology in the book's introduction, writing that the "hazards" of autobiography could not be fully avoided. Noting the book's considerable number of alterations from reality, invented composite characters, and restructured timelines, scholar David Garrow described Dreams as "a work of historical fiction" in his 2017 biography of Obama, Rising Star. David Remnick, another Obama biographer (The Bridge, 2010), described Dreams as "a mixture of verifiable fact, recollection, recreation, invention, and artful shaping." A number of factual inaccuracies or exaggerations in Dreams were also discussed by David Maraniss in his 2012 work Barack Obama: The Story; Maraniss describes the book as more akin to fictional literature than true autobiography.

Persons in the book 
With the exception of family members and a handful of public figures, Barack Obama says in the 2004 preface that he had changed names of others to protect their privacy. He also created composite characters to expedite the narrative flow. Some of his acquaintances have recognized themselves and acknowledged their names. Various researchers have suggested the names of other figures in the book:

Versions 

 New York: Times Books; 1st edition (July 18, 1995); Hardcover: 403 pages; 
 New York: Kodansha International (August 1996); Paperback: 403 pages; 
 New York: Three Rivers Press; Reprint edition (August 10, 2004); Paperback: 480 pages; 
 New York: Random House Audio; Abridged edition (May 3, 2005); Audio CD; ; Includes the senator's speech from the 2004 Democratic National Convention.
 New York: Random House Audio; Abridged edition on Playaway digital audio player 
 New York: Random House Large Print; 1st Large print edition (April 4, 2006); Hardcover: 720 pages; 
 New York: Crown Publishers (January 9, 2007); Hardcover: 464 pages; 
 New York: Random House (January 9, 2007); eBook; 
 Melbourne: Text Publishing (2008); Paperback: 442 pages; 

 Translations
 Arabic: Aḥlām min abī : qiṣṣat ʻirq wa-irth, translated by Hibah Najīb al-Sayyid Maghrabī; Īmān ʻAbd al-Ghanī Najm; Majdī ʻAbd al-Wāḥid ʻInabah, (2009), 
 Bosnian: Snovi moga oca : priča o rasi i naslijeđu, Sarajevo : Buybook (2008), 
 Chinese: 歐巴馬的夢想之路：以父之名, translated by Yao-Hui Wang and Kuan-Lan Shih. , Taipei, Taiwan, (2008), 
 Croatian: Snovi mojega oca : priča o rasi i naslijeđu, (2004), 
 Czech: Cesta za sny mého otce : jedna z nejpůsobivějších autobiografických knih o sebepoznání a hledání vlastní identity, translated by Marie Čermáková, Praha : Štrob, Širc & Slovák, (2009), 
 Danish: Arven fra min far : selvbiografi, Gyldendals Bogklubber, (2009), 
 Dutch: Dromen van mijn vader, translated by Joost Zwart, Atlas, (2007), 
 Finnish: Unelmia isältäni : kertomus rodusta ja sukuperinnöstä, translated by Seppo Raudaskoski and Mika Tiirinen, (2009), 
 French: Les rêves de mon père, translated by Paris Presses de La Cité, Paris, France, (2008), 
 German: Ein amerikanischer Traum, Carl Hanser Verlag (2008), 
 Greek, Modern: Eikones tou patera mou : he historia henos genous kai mias klēronomias, (2008), 
 Hebrew: חלומות מאבי (Ḥalomot me-avi), translated by Edna Shemesh, Tel Aviv, Israel, (2008), 
 Hindi: Pitā se mile sapane, translated by Aśoka Kumāra, Aravinda Kumāra Pabliśarsa, Guṛagām̐va,(2009), 
 Indonesian: Dreams from My father : pergulatan hidup Obama, (2009), 
 Japanese: , translated by Yuya Kiuchi, Mikiko Shirakura, (2007) 
 Korean: Nae abŏji robutŏ ŭi kkum (내 아버지로부터의 꿈), translated by Kyŏng-sik Yi, Random House Korea, Seoul, Korea, (2007), 
 Marathi: Ḍrīmsa phrôma māya phādara, translated by Yamājī Mālakara and Nītā Kulakarṇī, Ameya Prakāśana, (2009), 
 Persian: Ruyāhā-ye pedaram, translated by Rītū Baḥrī, (2009), 
 Persian: Ruyāhā-ye pidaram, translated by Manīzhih Shaykh Javādī, (2009), 
 Polish: Odziedziczone marzenia, translated by Piotr Szymczak, (2008), 
 Portuguese: A Minha Herança, translated by Artur Lopes Cardoso, Cruz Quebrada, (2008), 
 Portuguese: A Origem dos Meus Sonhos, translated by Irati Antonio, Renata Laureano & Sonia Augusto, (2008), 
 Serbian: Snovi moga oca : priča o rasi i nasleđu, translated by Vesna Džuverović; Jasna Simonović, (2008),
 Spanish: Los sueños de mi padre : una historia de raza y herencia, Vintage Español, New York City, New York, (2009), 
 Spanish: Los sueños de mi padre : una historia de raza y herencia, translated by Fernando Miranda; Evaristo Páez Rasmussen, Granada : Almed, (2008), 
 Swedish: Min far hade en dröm, Albert Bonniers förlag (2008), 
 Thai: Bārak ʻŌbāmā : phom likhit chiwit ʻēng, translated by Nopphadon Wētsawat, Krung Thēp : Samnakphim Matichon, (2008), 
 Turkish: Babamdan hayaller : [ırk ve kimlik mirasının öyküsü], İstanbul : Pegasus Yayınlar (2008), 
 Urdu: Obāmā kī āp bītī, translated by Yāsar Javvād, (2009), 
 Vietnamese: Những giấc mơ từ cha tôi, translated by Quang Nguyễn, (2008),

References

External links 
 Barack Obama interview, 1995 August from the Connie Martinson Talks Books collection in the Claremont Colleges Digital Library
 All editions at WorldCat

1995 non-fiction books
African-American autobiographies
Books about Barack Obama
Books by Barack Obama
Political autobiographies
American political books
Grammy Award for Best Spoken Word Album
Literary autobiographies
Books written by presidents of the United States